Jahaan Akil Sweet also known as J. Sweet, is an American musician, record producer, songwriter, and pianist from Jacksonville, Florida. He has produced for a variety of artists including Kehlani, Drake, Eminem, The Carters, Ty Dolla $ign, A Boogie Wit Da Hoodie, and Taylor Swift . He previously also served as a producer for Kehlani's in 2015. 
He is best known for co-writing and producing Kehlani's 2015 mixtape, You Should Be Here and A Boogie Wit Da Hoodie's "Drowning".

He has won two Grammy Awards from five nominations; his work on The Carters' Everything Is Love and Jon Batiste's We Are respectively won the Grammy Award for Best Urban Contemporary Album in 2019 and the Grammy Award for Album of the Year in 2022, respectively.

Early life 
Sweet was born and raised in North Jacksonville, Florida. He began playing piano at the age of six, and jazz piano at Lavilla School of the Arts by the age of eleven. After attending high school at Douglas Anderson School of the Arts, Sweet moved to New York City to attend Juilliard School's jazz studies program. In 2015, he was named a Juilliard Career Advancement Fellow.

Career 
In an interview with The Recording Academy, Sweet revealed that he met Kehlani at MBK Studios in New York while still attending school. From there, he produced two songs, "Get Away" and "How We Do Us," on Kehlani's project Cloud19. Sweet later flew back and forth between New York and Los Angeles to work with Kehlani on her subsequent mixtape, You Should Be Here, before graduating from Juilliard in 2015.

In 2016 and 2017, Sweet produced tracks for a number of notable albums including Ty Dolla $ign's Campaign ("Zaddy" and "$"), A Boogie Wit Da Hoodie's The Bigger Artist ("Drowning"), Kehlani’s SweetSexySavage ("Keep On" and "Personal"), Aminé's Good For You ("Veggies", "Slide", and "Heebiejeebies"), and Lana Del Rey's Lust for Life ("Summer Bummer").

In 2018, Sweet worked with Boi-1da to co-produce songs for Drake (Scorpion; "8 Out Of 10", "Final Fantasy", and "Ratchet Happy Birthday"), The Carters (Everything Is Love; "Friends" and "Heard About Us"). and Eminem (Kamikaze; "Lucky You").

Awards and nominations 
Apart from winning the Grammy Awards, Sweet has been featured in Forbes 30 under 30 2021 list.

Grammy Awards 
In 2016, Sweet was nominated for his work on Kehlani's You Should Be Here for Best Urban Contemporary Album at the 58th Annual Grammy Awards. In 2019, he was nominated thrice, winning Best Urban Contemporary Album for The Carters' Everything Is Love. In 2022, he won Album of the Year for his work on Jon Batiste's We Are.

References 

Living people
Grammy Award winners
20th-century American musicians
20th-century jazz composers
21st-century American musicians
21st-century jazz composers
American jazz pianists
American male jazz composers
American hip hop record producers
American rhythm and blues musicians
Jazz musicians from Florida
Musicians from Jacksonville, Florida
Year of birth missing (living people)